This is the list of scheduled destinations served or previously served by Icelandair and sister airline Icelandair Cargo :

Destinations

References 

Lists of airline destinations